Carondelet Reef is a horseshoe-shaped reef of the Phoenix Islands, also known as the Rawaki Islands, in the Republic of Kiribati. The sea occasionally breaks over it.

History
According to Admiral Adam Johann von Krusenstern, a Captain Kemin of an unidentified ship reported the discovery of a reef in position  in 1824, and this may have been the first sighting of Carondelet Reef by a Westerner. The next Westerner to see it may have been Captain Obed Starbuck of the Nantucket whaler Loper, who reported a "reef of rocks" at position  on February 19, 1826.

During a voyage from Puget Sound to Australia, Captain Wilder Farley Stetson (1849–1924) of the ship Carondelet sighted a reef on August 31, 1898, from position . He was within  of it and considered it very dangerous. He named it Carondelet Reef, after his ship.

The multiple positions of Winslow Reef mentioned by Robert Louis Stevenson may have been due to confusion of the position of Carondelet Reef with that of Winslow Reef.

Status
The reef is part of the Phoenix Islands Protected Area, an underwater nature reserve.

See also
 List of Guano Island claims

References

External links
Phoenix Islands Protected Area, Kiribati

Reefs of Kiribati
Seamounts of the Pacific Ocean
Pacific islands claimed under the Guano Islands Act